Alberto Cossentino (born 10 September 1988) is an Italian football defender who plays for Don Carlo Misilmeri.

Career

Club career 
A product of the Rosanero's youth system, Cossentino made his first team debut with the Rosanero being featured in the starter lineup in a Coppa Italia 2006-07 match against Sampdoria, and then a UEFA Cup 2006-07 game against Fenerbahçe. He was confirmed to the Rosanero first team squad also for the 2007–08 campaign, and finally made his Serie A debut on 30 March 2008 at Stadio San Paolo, against Napoli.

In July 2008 Cossentino accepted a loan to Serie B side Triestina in order to gain more first team experience. However, he did not manage to play a single match for the alabardati, and returned to Palermo in January 2009.

In July 2009 Cossentino agreed another move on loan, and spent the 2009–10 season with Lega Pro Prima Divisione side Novara, where he played only six games throughout a season that ended with his side winning the league and ensuring promotion to Serie B. In July 2010 Palermo announced to have sold half of Cossentino's registration rights to Novara. On 29 January 2011 he was loaned to Gela.
Cossentino made his second comeback to Novara in June 2011, as his co-ownership was solved in favour of the piemontesi. On 30 August 2011 he moved on loan to Andria BAT.

On 13 July 2012, he joined Reggiana on a permanent deal. He was released on 7 January 2015.

He joined Modena for the 2016–17 season, but was released later in January 2017 and successively signed by another Lega Pro club, Siracusa, on 2 February 2017 as a free transfer.

In June 2019, Cossentino joined Torres.

In October 2020 he signed for Eccellenza Sicily amateurs Don Carlo Misilmeri.

International career 
Cossentino has also appeared for the Italian team at Under-19 and Under-20 level.

References

External links 
Alberto Cossentino profile at aic.football.it 

1988 births
Living people
Italian footballers
Palermo F.C. players
U.S. Triestina Calcio 1918 players
Novara F.C. players
S.S.D. Città di Gela players
A.C. Reggiana 1919 players
Modena F.C. players
Siracusa Calcio players
Latina Calcio 1932 players
A.C.R. Messina players
S.E.F. Torres 1903 players
Serie A players
Serie B players
Serie C players
Serie D players
Footballers from Palermo
Association football defenders
S.F. Aversa Normanna players